Tom Kearns may refer to:

 Tom Kearns (baseball) (1859–1938), Major League Baseball player
 Tom Kearns (American football) (1919–2007), American politician and American football player

See also
 Thomas Kearns (1862–1918), American mining, banking, railroad and newspaper magnate
 Thomas Kearns (athlete) (born 1966), Irish athlete